John Batchelor (1842 – 15 February 1929) was a British trade unionist.

Batchelor worked as a bricklayer in Kensington.  In 1868, he joined the Operative Bricklayers' Society, and soon afterwards, he was elected as secretary of his branch.  He devoted a large amount of his time to the union, rising to become chairman of its executive then, in 1891, its full-time general secretary.

Batchelor also became increasingly associated with the trade union "Junta", counting Robert Applegarth, C. J. Drummond, George Howell, George Odger and George Shipton as close friends.

References

1842 births
1929 deaths
British bricklayers
British trade union leaders
People from Kensington